Arthur L. "Bud" Andrews (March 9, 1934 – October 26, 1996) was a Chief Master Sergeant in the United States Air Force who served as the 7th Chief Master Sergeant of the Air Force from 1981 to 1983.

Early life
Andrews was born in Boston, Massachusetts, where he attended Cathedral of Holy Cross, Bancroft and Rice Public Schools, and the English High School.

Military career
Andrews enlisted in the United States Air Force in January 1953 and completed basic training at Sampson Air Force Base, New York. His first assignment was to Keesler Air Force Base, Mississippi, in April 1953, where he began 12 years as an air policeman, including eight years as an investigator. After a short tour at Keesler, he was sent to Sheppard Air Force Base, Texas, and then to French Morocco, North Africa. Returning to the United States 12 months later, he was assigned to Travis Air Force Base, California, until January 1957, when he was honorably discharged.

In April 1958, Andrews re-enlisted and was sent to Homestead Air Force Base, Florida, for three months. Andrews was then assigned to Naha Air Base, Okinawa, Japan. He returned to the United States, and was assigned to Shaw Air Force Base, South Carolina, as an air police investigator. He then returned to Kadena Air Base in April 1965 as noncommissioned officer in charge (NCOIC) of the law enforcement administration section, and later NCOIC of protocol.  Andrews was then selected to cross-train as a First sergeant.

Andrews' first assignment as a First Sergeant began with the 4576th Transportation Squadron at Tyndall Air Force Base, Florida. Six months later he was assigned to the 497th Tactical Fighter Squadron at Ubon Royal Thai Air Force Base, Thailand. Following his return from Southeast Asia, he was assigned to the Defense Language Institute West Coast in Monterey, California. Two years later he received his second assignment to Southeast Asia at Cam Ranh Bay Air Base, South Vietnam, as First Sergeant for the 483rd Organizational Maintenance Squadron.

In December 1971, Andrews returned to Keesler and served initially with the 3385th Student Squadron and then with the 3392nd Student Squadron. While there he attended Class 73C of the Senior Noncommissioned Officer Academy at Gunter Air Force Station, Alabama. Upon graduation he transferred to the 6594th Test Group at Hickam Air Force Base, Hawaii. He was assigned to Headquarters Squadron Section at Hanscom Air Force Base, as the first sergeant from January 1976 to June 1977. Andrews was then selected as senior enlisted adviser to the commander, electronic systems division at Hanscom. He became senior enlisted adviser to the commander, Air Force Systems Command, Andrews Air Force Base, Maryland, in May 1978.

In 1981, Andrews was appointed the 7th Chief Master Sergeant of the Air Force. In this role he was senior enlisted advisor to the Chief of Staff of the Air Force General Charles A. Gabriel and the United States Secretary of the Air Force Verne Orr on matters concerning the enlisted force's welfare, effective utilization of manpower, and progress of the enlisted members of the Air Force.

Awards and decorations

References

1934 births
1996 deaths
United States Air Force airmen
Chief Master Sergeants of the United States Air Force
United States Air Force personnel of the Vietnam War
People from Boston
Recipients of the Humanitarian Service Medal